Weng im Innkreis is a municipality in the district of Braunau am Inn in the Austrian state of Upper Austria.

Geography
Weng lies on the western edge of the Innviertel hills. About 8 percent of the municipality is forest and 83 percent farmland.

References

Cities and towns in Braunau am Inn District